National League Cricket was an annual cricket tournament held in Nepal. It was administered by the Cricket Association of Nepal.

History 
The first organized league cricket in Nepal was held in 2002 as Birendra Memorial National League Cricket. Due to heavy rain, the final game set on 18 May between Biratnagar and Bhairahawa had to be cancelled and winners were declared on the basis of net run rate achieved before the final match. Biratnagar won the trophy with a run rate of +1.33 compared to +1.023 of Bhairahawa. The initial tournament was sponsored by Carlsberg.

In 2007, CAN signed sponsorship deals with Surya Nepal’s Shikhar Filter Kings, John Players and Standard Chartered Bank as the major sponsors of the revised national league and the national team for 5 years worth रु 20 Lakhs.

In 2008, the league was sponsored by Surya Nepal under the name of Springwood One Day National League held from March 28 to April 7. The event had all teams competing in round-robin league rather than in groups of three as used in past. In 2009, the league was sponsored by Pepsi and Standard Chartered Bank and the tournaments were held under the name Pepsi Standard Chartered National One Day and Twenty20 Cricket Tournament for the next five years. From the year 2011, two new departmental teams, the APF cricket team and Nepal Police cricket team joined the league. APF won the league in their first attempt. Nepal Police lost to APF in the one-day tournament but they won the Twenty20 tournament by defeating APF. Nepal Army cricket team joined the league in 2013. They also won the Twenty20 tournament in their first attempt. Nepal Police participated in the league only in 2011.

The 2015 edition of the tournament was solely sponsored by CAN itself as previous sponsors, Pepsi and Standard Chartered Bank's agreement ran out earlier that year.

Teams 
 Region-I (Biratnagar)
 Region-II (Birgunj)
 Region-III (Kathmandu)
 Region-IV (Bhairahawa)
 Region-V (Nepalgunj)
 Region-VI (Baitadi)
 Region-VII (Janakpur)
 Region-VIII (Pokhara)
 Region-XI (Dhangadhi)
 Armed Police Force Club
 Tribhuwan Army Club

Former teams 

 Nepal Police Club, 2011

Tournament history

Senior Men's One Day

Senior Men's Twenty20

Senior Two-day

Controversies 
In May 2010, 18 members of the national cricket team held a press conference and said they will not play the national league because of the behavior of Cricket Association of Nepal (CAN). However, they said they would continue their closed-camp training for 2010 ICC World Cricket League Division Four.

Players boycotted the national one-day cricket championship for the second time in April 2014 in protest against the leadership of CAN and ignorance of players' needs.

See also 

 Nepal Premier League
 SPA Cup
Prime Minister One Day Cup

References 

Nepalese domestic cricket competitions
2002 establishments in Nepal